Eudonia lijiangensis is a moth in the family Crambidae. It was described by Wei-Chun Li, Hou-Hun Li and Matthias Nuss in 2012. It is found in Yunnan, China.

The length of the forewings is 9–10 mm. The forewings are covered with dense blackish-brown scales. The antemedian, postmedian and subterminal lines are yellowish white. The hindwings are yellowish white.

Etymology
The species name refers to the type locality, Lijiang in Yunnan Province.

References

Moths described in 2012
Eudonia